The Jatigede Dam is an embankment dam on the Cimanuk River in Sumedang Regency, West Java, Indonesia. Construction on the dam began in 2008 and it was completed in 2015. The power station is expected to be commissioned in 2019. The primary purpose of the dam is irrigation but it will also provide for flood control, water supply and hydroelectric power generation. Water in the reservoir will be used to help irrigate  of farmland and the power station is expected to have a 110 MW capacity. The project has become controversial, primarily due to the relocation of people in the future reservoir zone.

Background
The dam was first proposed in 1963 after a study of the Cimanuk was carried out by Coyne et Bellier. Further planning and designs commenced thereafter. An environmental impact assessment was completed in 1986 and land acquisition study in 2003. After decades of planning and protests, the Indonesian Government announced firm plans to proceed with the dam in 2004.

The project has been surrounded with controversy over the years, particularly as its reservoir would flood  of land. This includes five districts and 30 villages which include approximately 70,000 people to be relocated. Affected residents claim that compensation for their land is too low and that the government intimidated them to accept offers in the 1980s. In addition, a 2011 study by Indonesia's Ministry of Public Works estimated that the reservoir would become ineffective in 50 years due to high sedimentation of the river. As a result, conservation activities in the watershed area of Cimanuk River would be undertaken by Ministry of Public Works, Ministry of Forestry, West Java Provincial Government and the relevant regency governments. Furthermore a cekdam (levee to prevent river from widening) in upper area of the Reservoir upper area of the Reservoir will be made. Thus, sedimentation can be lifted and will extend the life of the reservoir.

Despite the controversy, the government stated in 2004 that an agreement had been reached. The contract to build the dam and power plant was awarded to China's Sinohydro Corporation in May 2007. Construction on the dam's diversion tunnel began in October 2008 and was completed in August 2011. The government announced in late 2011 that that dam was 60% complete. In July 2011, it was announced that Perusahaan Listrik Negara would oversee the construction and operation of the 110 MW power plant. The dam and power plant is expected to cost US$224 million. In May 2013 the government announced that the total cost would be around $400 million and that the dam was 70% complete. Currently, the dam was expected to start impounding its reservoir in early 2015. This major step in construction has been repeatedly delayed due to resident relocations.

In December 2014, a contract was signed with Sinohydro to construct the power station. It should be operational in 2019. On 31 August 2015, the dam began to impound its reservoir, 30 days behind the most recent schedule.

Design
The dam's spillway will be a chute-type on the center of the downstream face. The irrigation intake will be located below the spillway. The dam's crest elevation will be  and the normal reservoir elevation .

See also

List of power stations in Indonesia

References

Dams in Indonesia
Hydroelectric power stations in Indonesia
Rock-filled dams
Reservoirs in Indonesia
Dams completed in 2015
2015 establishments in Indonesia